John McAvoy may refer to:
John McAvoy (footballer) (1878–?), Scottish footballer
John H. McAvoy (1830–1893), Chicago businessman and politician
John McAvoy (athlete), competitor in the Ironman Triathlon
John C. McAvoy, American football player and coach
Jack McAvoy (John H. McAvoy, c. 1930–2008), American football and basketball coach and college athletic administrator
Gerry McAvoy (John Gerrard McAvoy, born 1951), Northern Irish blues rock bass guitarist

See also
Jock McAvoy (1908–1971), British boxer